Lancelyn Green may be:

 Cilla Lancelyn Green, a British author (daughter of Roger Lancelyn Green)
 Richard Lancelyn Green (1953–2004), a British scholar of Arthur Conan Doyle and Sherlock Holmes (son of Roger Lancelyn Green)
 Roger Lancelyn Green (1918–1987), a British biographer and children's writer